Thomas McNeill Bennett (born 12 December 1969) is a Scottish former footballer.

Career
Born in Bo'ness, near Falkirk, Bennett joined Aston Villa on schoolboy forms aged 14, and was given a professional contract in 1987. However, he remained on their books as a senior pro for just one season before being released without making a first team appearance in July 1988. He joined fellow Midlanders Wolverhampton Wanderers the following day and made his league debut on 10 January 1989 as a substitute in a 2–0 win against Cardiff.

He made the vast majority of his Wolves appearances between 1990-1992 (in the second tier), and from then onward made only sporadic first team outings. He was eventually sold in June 1995 to Stockport County for £75,000.

At Edgeley Park, he quickly became a first choice player and was part of the team that won promotion from the Second Division in 1996–97, a season which also saw them reach the League Cup semi-finals. Here, he played in his preferred midfield role rather than the full-back position he had usually occupied with his previous club.

His career at County was interrupted by a broken leg sustained at Birmingham in January 1998. This injury ended his status as an automatic choice and he made just 17 further appearances for the club over the following two seasons.

After 146 appearances in total, he left Stockport for Walsall in July 2000, after previously having had two loan spells with them. He became their captain and helped them gain promotion to the First Division via the play-offs in his first full season, beating Reading in the final. He was a virtual ever-present in their first season back in the second flight, but departed at its conclusion for Boston United.

He played in Boston's inaugural season in the Football League, but left midway through their second season for fellow League Two side Kidderminster Harriers. However, Harriers were relegated from the league at the season's end and Bennett returned to his native Scotland with Hamilton Academical. His return proved short-lived though as he managed just three games in all before injury called time on his playing career.

Since leaving football, he joined a rock band as vocalist in the Stockport-based "Fracture".

Honours
With Walsall :-
Football League Second Division play-off winner: 2001

References

External links

Stockport County official profile
Fracture official website

1969 births
Living people
Scottish footballers
English Football League players
Aston Villa F.C. players
Wolverhampton Wanderers F.C. players
Stockport County F.C. players
Walsall F.C. players
Boston United F.C. players
Kidderminster Harriers F.C. players
Hamilton Academical F.C. players
People from Bo'ness
Footballers from Falkirk (council area)
Scottish Football League players
Association football midfielders